Antinomy is a collection by Spider Robinson published in 1980.

Plot summary
Antinomy is a collection of science fiction short stories, songs, and puns.

Reception
Greg Costikyan reviewed Antinomy in Ares Magazine #6 and commented that "Anyone who likes science fiction cannot fail, I think, to enjoy Robinson's work."

Reviews
Review by Andrew Andrews (1981) in Science Fiction Review, Summer 1981

References

1980 novels